The Light Shines On Vol 2 is a compilation album by Electric Light Orchestra (ELO). Released in 1979 by Harvest Records as a follow up to 1977's The Light Shines On, it is a compilation of their early years with the label.

Track listing 

Side one

Side two

Personnel
Jeff Lynne – bass guitar, percussion, piano, guitar, vocals, Moog synthesizer
Roy Wood – guitar, bass guitar, clarinet, percussion, Krumhorn, cello, Shawm, Recorder, vocals, Slide Guitar
Bev Bevan – percussion, drums
Bill Hunt – French Horn
Steve Woolam – violin
Mike de Albuquerque – bass guitar, vocals
Mike Edwards – cello
Wilfred Gibson – violin
Richard Tandy – Moog synthesizer, piano, guitar, Harmonium
Colin Walker – cello

References

1979 greatest hits albums
Albums produced by Jeff Lynne
Albums produced by Roy Wood
Electric Light Orchestra compilation albums
Harvest Records compilation albums